Semmens is a surname. Notable people with the surname include:

 Dean Semmens (born 1979), Australian water polo player
 Edwin James Semmens (1886–1980), principal of Victorian School of Forestry, Australia
 Robert Semmens (born 1961), Australian rules footballer